Kalii is a settlement in Kenya's Makueni County. It is located about 20 kilometres north of Makindu town.

Kalii is located in the Twaandu location  in Makindu division of Makueni County. Kalii is also part of Twaandu/Kiboko ward of Kibwezi Constituency and Makueni County Council.

References 

Makueni County
Populated places in Eastern Province (Kenya)